Carlos María de Alvear (October 25, 1789 in Santo Ángel, Rio Grande do Sul – November 3, 1852 in New York),  was an Argentine soldier and statesman, Supreme Director of the United Provinces of the Río de la Plata in 1815.

Early life
He was born in Santo Ángel in the northern part of the Viceroyalty of the River Plate (now in Rio Grande do Sul) to a Spanish nobleman father, Diego de Alvear y Ponce de León, and a criollo mother, María Balbastro and baptised Carlos Antonio del Santo Ángel Guardián. His birthplace Santo Ángel was, at that time, part of Misiones Province, but currently belongs to the Brazilian state of Rio Grande do Sul.

While travelling to Spain with his family on board a Spanish Navy squadron in 1804, a Royal Navy fleet attacked the squadron on 5 October, capturing or destroying all four of the Spanish frigates present. The battle was a preamble to the Anglo-Spanish War between the two countries; during the engagement, Alvears's brothers and mother were killed by stray cannon fire, though he survived the battle to be taken as a prisoner of war by the British along with his father to England. There, he would meet and marry an Irish woman.

Honouring his mother, Carlos de Alvear adopted the name of Carlos María de Alvear. During his stay in Britain, the 15-year-old Carlos was given an English-style education, adopting, in his adult age, what some would later see as a position amenable to British interests.

Like many other nineteenth century Argentines prominent in public life, he was a freemason.

Military career
Alvear was one of the few professional military officers to participate in the Argentine War of Independence on the side of the revolutionaries, having served in the Spanish Army during the Napoleonic Wars. He became an active Freemason. While in Cadiz, he founded the Sociedad de los Caballeros Racionales, a masonic secret society, made up of South Americans. José de San Martín, with whom Alvear would always have a conflictive and contradictory relationship, would later also become a member of this secret society.

He returned to Buenos Aires on board the British merchantman George Canning, in which were also travelling San Martín, Juan Matías Zapiola, Francisco Chilavert and other soldiers. Upon his arrival, Alvear was named Lieutenant Coronel of the young Argentine army. He led the action against the Royal army under Gaspar Vigodet in Montevideo, replacing José Rondeau and making the Oriental leader José Gervasio Artigas an enemy.

Alvear was a leader of the constituent Assembly of the year 1813 and, goaded by political ambition, succeeded in establishing a Unitarian (centralizing) form of government, having his uncle Gervasio Antonio de Posadas named Supreme Director (chief executive).

In early 1814, Alvear was appointed commander in chief of the forces defending the capital. A few months later, he replaced General José Rondeau as commander in chief of the army besieging Montevideo, the last bastion of Spanish power in the River Plate, which was defended by 5,000 troops. In late June 1814, as news that Ferdinand VII had recovered the crown of Spain, Alvear managed to force the surrender of the Spanish troops in Montevideo. It was the biggest victory for the cause of independence since 1810. He was only 25 and the most successful general of the revolution. He returned to Buenos Aires to claim his laurels but a revolt forced him back to the Banda Oriental. After a quick and decisive campaign, his forces defeated the caudillos that opposed the government.

At the end of 1814 Alvear was named commander of the Army of the North, but he lacked of support from Posadas, and his unpopularity among the troops, and other disagreements—including a project for a constitutional monarchy that he sent to Europe to be negotiated by Manuel Belgrano, that was fiercely opposed by the League of Free Peoples—made him return to Buenos Aires. On January 9, 1815, at 25 years of age, he was chosen to replace his uncle Posadas as Supreme Director.

Having neither the support of the troops nor sufficient influence on the people of the hinterland provinces, Director Alvear then attempted to come to an alliance with Artigas, to whom he offered the independence of the Banda Oriental (current Uruguay). In exchange, Artigas would withdraw his army from the Argentine Littoral. But Artigas declined the offer, and Alvear sent troops to occupy the area.

At this time he was in correspondence with the British ambassador, Viscount Strangford in Rio de Janeiro, in order to ask for a British intervention. Following a mutiny among his troops, and under pressure from the Cabildo, Alvear resigned on April 15, and left the country. He was in exile in Rio de Janeiro until 1818. In May of that year, he moved to Montevideo where he joined his friend, the Chilean Jose Miguel Carrera, also exiled due to political differences with San Martin and Bernardo O'Higgins.

Diplomatic missions to England, United States and Bolivia
Alvear returned to Argentina in 1822 thanks to an amnesty law (Ley del olvido). At the end of 1823, Bernardino Rivadavia named him minister plenipotentiary to the United States. Before going to Washington, Alvear stopped in London and managed to get an interview with George Canning, the British Foreign Secretary. Weeks after this interview, the British government formally recognized the independence of the United Provinces of the Rio de la Plata. In 1825, together with José Miguel Díaz Vélez, Carlos María de Alvear was sent by the Buenos Aires government to Bolivia to meet with Simón Bolívar. The real objective of the so-called Alvear-Díaz Velez Mission was to seek Bolívar's support in the looming war with the Empire of Brazil, over the Banda Oriental. It was proposed that Bolívar should lead a Hispanic American alliance that can exert pressure on Dom Pedro I to withdraw his army stationed in the Eastern Province. The mission, which was created by an Act passed on May 9, 1825, gave Alvear and Díaz Vélez authority to negotiate and settle issues involving the liberation of the four provinces of Alto Peru. Alvear had also a project of his own: the creation of a big republic in South America comprising Argentina, Chile, Bolivia, Paraguay and Uruguay. He asked Bolívar to be its first president. The Venezuelan leader was sympathetic to this project but dissensions in Gran Colombia forced him to abandon it.

War against the Empire of Brazil
To neutralize Alvear's political ambitions, newly elected President Bernardino Rivadavia appointed him his Minister of War and Navy in early 1826. In a short period of time, and with limited resources, Alvear was able to raise an army of 8.000 men to wage war against the Empire of Brazil. Conflicting claims over the Banda Oriental (which included current Uruguay) pushed both countries into conflict. Victory seemed unattainable to the Argentines. At the time, Brazil had a population of close to 5 million inhabitants (including 2 million slaves), a standing army of 120.000 men and a naval fleet of almost 80 vessels. In contrast, the fledgling Argentine Republic had only 700,000 inhabitants and faced the secession of almost half of its provinces.

Fearing a Brazilian invasion of Argentine territory, in mid-1826, President Rivadavia appointed Alvear as commander in chief of the Argentine army, which was in mutiny. Alvear quickly restored discipline and put the troops in fighting condition. By the end of the year, after only three months on the job, he took the initiative and launched an invasion of the Brazilian province of Rio Grande do Sul. Among Alvear's objectives was to promote a slave rebellion which would force the Emperor to seek an armistice.

During the first months of 1827 Cisplatine War, the Argentine Army entered Brazilian territory and defeated the Brazilians at Bagé, Ombú, Camacuá and the great Battle of Ituzaingó, probably the most important victory of his career. It was his brilliant and fearless conduct during this campaign, and the memorable victory which ended it, that made controversial Alvear a national hero among Argentine people ever since. However, internal dissensions in Argentina and the signing of what was perceived to be a humiliating peace treaty brought down Rivadavia's presidency. Without any political backing or support from Buenos Aires. Alvear tendered his resignation and returned to Buenos Aires. When he arrived in the capital, he realized he had been removed by the new government, which did everything possible to discredit him and Rivadavia.

Alvear and Rosas
In 1829 Juan Manuel de Rosas appeared in the Argentine political scene, inaugurating a controversial regime that on and off would last almost 23 years. Alvear was one of the leaders of the opposition and, in 1832, Rosas appointed him ambassador to the United States, as a way of neutralizing his political ambitions. A change in government the following year allowed Alvear to remain in Buenos Aires. However, when Rosas returned to power in 1835, he again tried to get rid of Alvear, who he suspected was conspiring against his government.

Argentina's first ambassador to the United States
In early 1837, after discovering evidence that linked Alvear to a new conspiracy, Rosas appointed him Argentina's first minister plenipotentiary to the United States. However, he was only able to depart the following year. Alvear spent the rest of his life as ambassador in the U.S. and died in his house in New York in November 1852. During his residence in the United States, Alvear had the opportunity to meet and interact with important political figures such as Joel Roberts Poinsett, Daniel Webster, John Calhoun and James Buchanan, among others. Alvear's instructions were mostly concerned with obtaining an apology from the United States regarding the conduct of an American warship at the Falkland Islands, and to reassert Argentine claims to those islands. The U.S. government was indifferent to the Argentine claims. Seeing that nothing more could be expected from Washington, Alvear requested to be transferred to Europe, but Rosas refused. As the conflict between Argentina and France, and later Britain, intensified, Alvear tried to get the support of the United States arguing that it would be consistent with the Monroe Doctrine. At the time, however, the United States was more concerned about the situation in Texas and Oregon, so remained neutral in this conflict. Although a political enemy of Rosas, Alvear admired him for his firm advocacy for a military response to outside intervention.

Although he had been a lifelong admirer of the United States, after the annexation of Texas (1845) and the subsequent war with Mexico (1846–1848), Alvear became wary of American intentions towards Spanish America. According to his American biographer Thomas Davis, his diplomatic correspondence shaped Argentina's traditional distrust to U.S. policies, which Alvear felt included the desire to conquer, or at least dominate, all of Latin America.

Carlos María de Alvear was buried in La Recoleta Cemetery in Buenos Aires.

Legacy
Bartolomé Mitre, author of the biography of San Martín Historia de San Martín y de la emancipación sudamericana, was very critical of Alvear, describing him as an ambitious and dictatorial. Most later historians reject Alvear as well, albeit for different reasons. Leftist authors support Monteagudo but reject Alvear, despite their political relation. Revisionist authors, supporters of anti-imperialism, condemn Alvear for the attempt to turn the United Provinces into a British protectorate and relate him with the party of Bernardino Rivadavia, despite them being enemies.

References

Bibliography
 
 Alvear, Carlos Maria de, El general Alvear a propósito de las memorias del general Iriarte, Emece Editores, Buenos Aires, 1986.
 Carranza, Ángel J., Biografía del General don Carlos María de Alvear, Documento manuscrito, Colección Alvear, AGN, Buenos Aires.
 Comisión del Segundo Centenario del General Carlos María de Alvear, Emece Editores, Buenos Aires, 1989.
 Davis, Thomas B.: Carlos de Alvear, Man of Revolution. The Diplomatic Career of Argentina's First Minister to the United States. Durham, NC, Duke University Press, 1955
 Fernandez Lalanne, Pedro, Los Alvear, Emecé Editores, Buenos Aires, 1980.
 Ocampo, Emilio, Alvear en la Guerra con el Imperio de Brasil, Editorial Claridad, Buenos Aires, 2003.
 Rodríguez, Gregorio F., Historia de Alvear, Cía. Sudamericana de Billetes de Banco, 2 tomos, Buenos Aires, 1909
 Rodríguez, Gregorio F., Contribución Histórica y Documental, Buenos Aires, 3 tomos, Talleres “Casa Jacobo Peuser”, 1921.
 Biography.
 Alvear's letter to San Martín while in exile

External links

1789 births
1852 deaths
People from Rio Grande do Sul
Argentine people of Spanish descent
Argentine Freemasons
Argentine generals
Supreme Directors of the United Provinces of the Río de la Plata
People of the Cisplatine War
Argentine diplomats
Spanish generals
Ambassadors of Argentina to the United States
People of the Argentine War of Independence
Burials at La Recoleta Cemetery
Spanish military personnel of the Napoleonic Wars
Patrician families of Buenos Aires